Nikola Nikolov may refer to:

 Nikola Koev Nikolov (Mamin Kolyu),  Bulgarian revolutionary of the Internal Macedonian-Adrianopolitan Revolutionary Organization (IMARO)
 Nikola Nikolov (opera singer), Bulgarian opera singer
 Nikola Nikolov (footballer, born 1908) (1908-1996), Bulgarian international footballer
 Nikola Nikolov (footballer, born 1986), Bulgarian footballer
 Nikola Dinev Nikolov, Bulgarian heavyweight Greco-Roman wrestler

See also
 Nikolay Nikolov (disambiguation)
 :bg:Никола Николов, a more extensive list in Bulgarian Wikipedia